Vladyslav Ivanovich Akymenko (born 5 March 1953) was a Soviet sailor. He won a Silver medal  at the 1976 Summer Olympics in Montreal in the Tempest class, along with Valentin Mankin.

References

1953 births
Olympic silver medalists for the Soviet Union
Sailors at the 1976 Summer Olympics – Tempest
Medalists at the 1976 Summer Olympics
Olympic sailors of the Soviet Union
Soviet male sailors (sport)
Olympic medalists in sailing
Living people